Gnathophis neocaledoniensis is an eel in the family Congridae (conger/garden eels). It was described by Emma Stanislavovna Karmovskaya in 2004. It is a marine, deep water-dwelling eel which is known from New Caledonia (from which its species epithet is derived), in the western Pacific Ocean. It dwells at a depth range of 520–580 metres. Males can reach a maximum total length of 18.5 centimetres.

References

neocaledoniensis
Fish described in 2004